None the Wiser is the fourth studio album by The Rifles released 26 January 2014, produced by Dave McCracken, Jamie Ellis, and Charles Rees.

Track listing

The last track contains a hidden track titled "On Top of the World".

Notes

2011 albums
The Rifles (band) albums